Elachista leucastra is a moth of the family Elachistidae. It is found in Tasmania, Australia.

The wingspan is about 12 mm. The forewings and hindwings are dark grey.

References

Moths described in 1906
leucastra
Moths of Australia